Arthur R. Smith (1887 – after 1914) was an English professional footballer who played as an outside left for Birmingham in the Football League. Born in Stourbridge, Worcestershire, Smith combined football with a career as a schoolteacher. Popularly known as "Nipper", he was renowned for his pace and for his ability to cross the ball early.

References

1887 births
Year of death missing
Sportspeople from Stourbridge
English footballers
Association football outside forwards
Brierley Hill Alliance F.C. players
Queens Park Rangers F.C. players
Birmingham City F.C. players
English Football League players
Date of birth missing
Place of death missing